WAKN-LP (analog channel 11) was a low-power television station in Akron, Ohio, United States. It was an affiliate of Jewelry Television, and also carried local programming. Despite its ownership being under the name of Ohio Public Television Corporation (itself based out of the derelict studio facilities of KUMY-LD in Beaumont, Texas), it was a for-profit enterprise and not a public television station, nor a non-commercial operation.

WAKN had been noted as silent in Federal Communications Commission records since November 20, 2005, though when it did go silent is unknown. The license had apparently been rolled over with supposed periods of activity mainly with a test pattern and station identification, and had been renewed until October 2021. Despite the FCC adding a rule in 2014 precluding 'one day a year' operation of a station merely to keep a license activated to block new licensees who would operate a station as a going concern, there was no explanation for why WAKN-LP's license remained active for over sixteen years after being taken silent.

In 2011, Cleveland CBS affiliate WOIO (channel 19) launched a digital fill-in translator on channel 10 within Akron on the same tower as WAKN-LP, which easily overwhelmed its occasional analog signal on channel 11.

The station applied for a digital flash cut in February 2014, its last known FCC communication, which was immediately dismissed due to interference and short-spacing concerns with WPCW in the Pittsburgh market; WPCW broadcasts its digital signal on channel 11. 

The FCC canceled WAKN-LP's license on January 20, 2022.

References

Defunct television stations in the United States
AKN-LP
Television channels and stations established in 2005
Television channels and stations disestablished in 2022
2022 disestablishments in Ohio
AKN-LP